Abu Salim (born 1956) is an Indian actor in Malayalam movies, in which he has played villains roles and other characters. He has also acted in a few Tamil, Hindi, Kannada and Telugu films.

Early life and background
Abu Salim was born as the second son among 6 children to Kunhammed and Fathima at Kalpetta in Wayanad. He had his primary education from S.K.M.J. High school, Kalpetta, Waynad. His debut movie was Rajan Paranja Kadha in 1978.

He is a Police Officer by profession and retired as a Sub-Inspector in 2012. He won the Mr. Calicut Title in 1981, Mr. Kerala in 1982, Mr. South India thrice in 1983, 1986 and 1987, and Mr. India title in 1984 and fifth place in 1992.

Personal life
He married Ummukulsu on 23 May 1982. The couple have a daughter, Sabitha and a son, Sanu Salim. Sabitha is married to Ashik TK and is living in Wollongong  and the couple have two kids, Lutfa and Luann Ashik . Sanu Salim runs a restaurant in Kalpetta, a media studio in Calicut and a packet food manufacturing company in Cochin. He is married to Rizwana Parveen and the couple have three children, Alaaya, Alvira and Azlaan.

Filmography

Malayalam

 1978 Rajan Paranja Kadha
 1988 Puraavrutham
 1990 Brahma Rakshass as gunda
 1991 kalari as police officer
 1992 Aayushkalam as Peter
 1992 Johnnie Walker
 1993 Yadhavam
 1994 Rudraksham
 1994 Cabinet as goonda
 1994 Vishnu
 1994 Sadaram
 1994 Pingami
 1995 Street as goonda
 1995 Boxer as Hebro Daniel
 1996 Rajaputhran as Karunan
 1996 Yuvathurki as Jackson
 1996 Patanayakan as Phayalwan
 1996 Indraprastham as goonda
 1997 The Car as Ambrose 
 1997 Guru Sishyan as Vasu
 1997 Kudamaattam 1998 Soorya Vanam 1999 Pallavur Devanarayanan 1999 Stalin Sivadas 1999 Captain as Chandu
 1999 Devi as Dantra
 1999 Panchapandavar 1999 Pattaabhishekam 2000 Rapid Action Force as goonda
 2000 Naadan Pennum Naattupramaaniyum 2000 The Gang as Life Guard
 2000 Darling Darling 2001 Ee Nadu Innalevare 
 2001 Red Indians as Pokken
 2001 Sraavu 2001 Unnathangalilas Prabhu
 2003 Mizhi Randilum as Srada's husband
 2003 C.I.D. Moosa as CI George
2004 Vesham 2004 Wanted 2004 Vismayathumbathu as Inspector Ravi
 2005 Thommanum Makkalum as Manikyan
 2005 Chandrolsavam as Kelu
 2005 Bus Conductor 2005 Police 2005 Pauran 2005 Ben Johnson 2005 Rajamanikyam as goonda
 2006 9 KK Road as Varkey
 2006 Prajapathi as Krishnankutty
 2006 Yes Your Honour 2007 Nanma as Ayappan
 2007 Kaiyoppu as Circle Inspector
 2007 Inspector Garud as Karinchantha Vasu
 2007 Panthaya Kozhi as Manikyam
 2007 Black Cat as Kishore
 2007 Hallo as Hameed
 2007 Mission 90 Days as DSP Sivaji
 2008 Roudram as CI Hamsa
 2008 Chembada 2008 Parunthu as Prabhakaran
 2009 Pramukhan 2009 Chattambi Nadu 2009 [Ee Pattanathil Bhootham] 2009 Loudspeaker as goonda
 2010 Brahmasthram as Ramachandran
 2010 Penpattanam 
 2010 Valiyangadi as Police Officer Prathapan
 2010 Shikkar as DYSP Karunakaran
 2010 Thanthonni as Goonda
 2010 Ringtone as Gopi
 2010 College Days as SI Vaasu
 2010 Annarakkannanum Thannalayathu as Eshwara Varma
 2010 Drona 2010 2011 Manushyamrugam as Prisoner
 2011 Collector as CI Xavior
 2011 Ulakam Chuttum Valiban as SP Krishnakumar
 2011 Venicile Vyapari as Abdhu
 2012 MLA Mani: Patham Classum Gusthiyum as Govindan
 2012 Mayamohini as Paili
 2012 My Boss as Vasu
 2013 Kutteem Kolum as Shanavas
 2013 Proprietors: Kammath & Kammath 2013 Blackberry 
 2013 Housefull 2013 Nadodi Mannan as Kannappan
 2013 Immanuel as Chandy
 2013 D Company as Kartha
 2013 Ladies and Gentleman as Vinod
 2013 Daivathinte Swantham Cleetus as Udumbu Salim
 2014 Rajadhi Raja as Sandeep
 2015 Bhaskar The Rascal as Suresh
 2015 Ivan Maryadaraman as Rudran
 2015 Loham As Ali Imran
 2015 Amar Akbar Anthony as Stalin Mammali
 2016 Kasaba as Pazhani
 2016 Welcome To Central Jail as Krishnadas
 2017 Pretham Und Sookshikkuka 2017 Oru Cinemakkaran as Ganeshan
 2018 Lolans 2018 Uncle 2018 Johny Johny Yes Appa as Stephen
 2019 Pattabhiraman as Johnson
 2019 MASK as Subair
 2020 Power Star (2020 film) 2019 Edakkad Battalion 06 
 2020 Power Star (2020 film) 2021 One as Jayakrishnan
 2022 Bheeshma Parvam as Shivankutty
 2022 Kenkemam as police officer
 2023 PookkaalamHindi
 Malamaal Weekly  (2006)
 Kamaal Dhamaal Malamaal (2012)

Telugu
 Devi (1999)
 Devi Putrudu (2001)

TamilRatchagan (1997)
 Majaa'' (2005)

References

External links

Abu Salim at MSI

Living people
Indian male film actors
Male actors from Kerala
Male actors in Tamil cinema
Male actors in Malayalam cinema
1956 births
People from Wayanad district
20th-century Indian male actors
21st-century Indian male actors
Male actors in Hindi cinema
Male actors in Telugu cinema